Jeffrey Holland (born Jeffrey Michael Parkes, 17 July 1946) is a British actor who is well known for roles in television sitcoms, playing comic Spike Dixon at the Maplin's holiday camp in Hi-de-Hi!, as well as BBC Radio comedy, including Week Ending. He also played leading roles in the sitcoms You Rang, M'Lord? and Oh, Doctor Beeching!.

Early life 
Born in Walsall, Staffordshire, he was educated at Queen Mary's Grammar School, Walsall. Holland joined an amateur theatre company and soon found that he had a talent for comedy, but despite this he could not pursue a career in comedy until after he left home. He has said that "my father died when I was 14, so right after leaving school at 16 I secured a job to earn money to help my mother. I worked at a wine merchant's and an office in Walsall, where I was brought up".

After leaving home Holland trained at Birmingham School of Speech Training and Dramatic Art and became a professional actor. His first stage appearance was at the Alexandra Theatre in 1967, in No Fear or Favour, a play by Henry Cecil Leon.

Holland first appeared on television in Crossroads, but this was in a non-speaking role. His first speaking role came in an episode of Dixon of Dock Green in 1974. He has described Jack Warner, who played Dixon, as "a perfect gentleman".

Acting career
After Dixon of Dock Green Holland worked with Jimmy Perry and David Croft for the first time when he took over the role of Private Walker in the Dad’s Army Stage Show.

Throughout the 1970s Holland made one-off guest appearances in television shows such as Are You Being Served, Dad's Army and It Ain't Half Hot Mum. He also appeared in several episodes of Crossroads but it was in 1980 that he broke through to fame in the role of Spike Dixon, the resident comic at Maplin's holiday camp in Hi-de-Hi! by Jimmy Perry and David Croft, who were already well acquainted with his work.  Later that year Holland appeared alongside Russ Abbot in The Russ Abbot Show and Russ Abbot’s Madhouse.

Jimmy Perry and David Croft used three main Hi-de-Hi! actors, Paul Shane, Holland and Su Pollard, for their next joint project, You Rang, M'Lord?, which ran from 1988 to 1993.  Holland played the footman James Twelvetrees. You Rang, M’Lord? was not as successful as Hi-de-Hi! in the UK, but it was very well received in Eastern Europe and especially in Hungary. When attending an event in Budapest Holland said: "I’d never heard anything like it. I could have been Elvis Presley or The Beatles, the noise they made. I did my bit, when off stage I burst into tears because it was so overwhelming".  Holland once again worked alongside Paul Shane and Su Pollard in another series by David Croft, Oh, Doctor Beeching!. It ran from 1995 to 1997 and was co-written by Richard Spendlove.

In 2001 Holland performed in Goon Again, the 50th anniversary celebration of The Goon Show. He took the parts originally played by Peter Sellers, alongside Jon Glover playing Spike Milligan's roles, Andrew Secombe playing the son of his father Harry's character Neddie Seagoon and Christopher Timothy.

In 2011 Holland appeared in Coronation Street as Clive Drinkwater.

In 2012 he was cast in the film version of Ray Cooney's farce Run for Your Wife as Dick Holland. The film was met with an overwhelmingly negative response from both critics and audiences.

In 2013 he debuted his short one-man play ... And This Is My Friend Mr Laurel, based on the life of Stan Laurel, at the Camden Fringe festival. This was taken on tour in the UK in 2014–2015. The play was devised by Holland and written by Gail Louw.

In November 2020 Holland attended a virtual Hi-de-Hi! reunion via Zoom, which was streamed to YouTube. Also attending the reunion were his co-stars from the show including Su Pollard, Ruth Madoc, Nikki Kelly, Linda Regan and David Webb.

In 2021 Jeffrey made his first appearance in the radio and podcast sitcom Barmy Dale playing the role of Rev Wilkins, he stars alongside his wife Judy Buxton who plays Mildred. Barmy Dale is now in pre production of Series 3|url=https://www.barmyproductions.com/listen-to-barmy-dale-1|access date 29-01/2023|website=Barmy Productions|language=en-GB}}</ref>

In April 2021 the British Comedy Guide reported that Holland would be co-starring in a new comedy pilot called Simply Ken, set in Sheffield in the 1980s. It was reported that starring alongside Holland would be his wife Judy Buxton and Craig Shepherd in the title role. Co-creator Alan Marni expressed his confidence about the project, saying that “it’s a great script, we’re got some great actors”.

Personal life
Holland is married to the actress Judy Buxton. The couple married in 2004.

Television roles

References

External links

 Jeffrey Holland Interview Best British TV

1946 births
Living people
English male television actors
People from Walsall
People educated at Queen Mary's Grammar School
20th-century English male actors
21st-century English male actors
The Goon Show